Cornworthy is a village and civil parish in the South Hams, Devon, England.

The nearby Cornworthy Priory, originally established for nuns of the order of St. Austin, is now a Grade I listed building.

Cornworthy Church contains the tomb of the Harris family, who were Lords of the Manor from the mid-sixteenth century onwards. It was erected by Lady Elizabeth Harris, widow of Sir Thomas Harris, in 1611, to the memory of her husband who died in 1610. Elizabeth is buried in the tomb, as are several other members of the family including Sir Edward Harris (died 1636), eldest son of Thomas and Elizabeth. Edward spent much of his life in Ireland, where he became a substantial landowner and Chief Justice of Munster. He was the grandfather of the celebrated faith healer Valentine Greatrakes. Thomas and Elizabeth's family also included Anne who became a noted poet.

References

External links

 Village website
 GENUKI page

Civil parishes in South Hams
Villages in South Hams